David A. Plawecki (November 8, 1947 – August 4, 2013) was an American politician.

Born in Detroit, Michigan, Plawecki served in the Michigan State Senate as a Democrat during 1970–1982. While serving in the Michigan State Senate, he authored PA 267 of 1976, also known as Michigan's Open Meetings Act, which has since been a key piece of legislation for government transparency. Plawecki lived in Dearborn Heights, Michigan, and was an engineer. Later, he was deputy director of the Michigan State Department of Labor and Economic Growth. He was Polish-American.

Notes

1947 births
2013 deaths
Politicians from Detroit
People from Dearborn Heights, Michigan
Democratic Party Michigan state senators
American politicians of Polish descent